Elias Pitzer House is a historic home located near Martinsburg, Berkeley County, West Virginia. It was built in 1856 and is an "L"-shaped, two-story, brick Greek Revival-style dwelling. It is five bays wide and has a gable roof. The front entry features a one-story, one bay, Greek Revival-style portico.

It was listed on the National Register of Historic Places in 2003.

References

Houses on the National Register of Historic Places in West Virginia
Greek Revival houses in West Virginia
Houses completed in 1856
Houses in Berkeley County, West Virginia
National Register of Historic Places in Martinsburg, West Virginia